José Andrés Hurtado Cheme (born 23 December 2001) is an Ecuadorian professional footballer who plays as a right-back for the Campeonato Brasileiro Série A club Red Bull Bragantino.

Club career
Hurtado made his senior debut with Independiente del Valle in a 0–0 Ecuadorian Serie A tie with Delfín S.C. on 2 November 2019. He formally joined the Independiente del Valle senior team on 10 February 2021.

Red Bull Bragantino

International career
Hurtado was called up to represent the Ecuador national football team at the 2021 Copa America.

He made his debut on 5 September 2021 in a World Cup qualifier against Chile, a 0–0 home draw. He started the game and was substituted after 57 minutes.

References

External links
 
 

2001 births
Living people
People from Santo Domingo de Los Tsáchilas Province
Ecuadorian footballers
Ecuadorian expatriate footballers
Ecuadorian expatriate sportspeople in Brazil
Expatriate footballers in Brazil
Ecuador international footballers
C.S.D. Independiente del Valle footballers
Red Bull Bragantino players
Ecuadorian Serie A players
Campeonato Brasileiro Série A players
2021 Copa América players
Association football fullbacks
21st-century Ecuadorian people